Ervin Szerelemhegyi (March 23, 1891 – October 3, 1969) was a Hungarian track and field athlete who competed in the 1912 Summer Olympics. He was born and died in Budapest.

In 1912 he was eliminated in the semi-final of the 400 metre competition. In the 100 metre event as well as in the 200 metre competition he was eliminated in the first round. He was also a member of the Hungarian relay team which was eliminated in the first round of the 4x400 metre relay event.

References

External links
list of Hungarian athletes

1891 births
1969 deaths
Hungarian male sprinters
Olympic athletes of Hungary
Athletes (track and field) at the 1912 Summer Olympics
Athletes from Budapest